Jivan Daulat Singh Lotay (born 25 July 1990) is an English former first-class cricketer.

Lotay was born at High Wycombe in July 1990. He later studied at Anglia Ruskin University, where he played five first-class matches for Cambridge UCCE/MCCU in 2009 and 2010. He scored 87 runs in his five matches, at an average of 17.40 and a high score of 34 not out. With his off break bowling, he took 7 wickets with best figures of 3 for 147. After graduating from Anglia Ruskin, he became an optometrist.

Notes and references

External links

1990 births
Living people
People from High Wycombe
Alumni of Anglia Ruskin University
English cricketers
Cambridge MCCU cricketers
British sportspeople of Indian descent
British Asian cricketers